The first USS Estero (CVE-42) (previously AVG-42 then later ACV-42) was an escort aircraft carrier launched 22 March 1943 by the Seattle-Tacoma Shipbuilding Corporation, Seattle, Washington, and sponsored by Mrs. C. N. Ingraham.  She was reclassified CVE-42 on 15 July 1943.  Completed in October 1943, she was transferred to the Royal Navy on 3 November 1943 and commissioned the same day as HMS Premier.

She served in World War II as an ASW escort carrier in European waters and additionally as a ferry carrier.  She was returned to United States custody 2 April 1946, she was stricken on 21 May 1946 and was sold into merchant service as the Rhodesia Star (later renamed Hong Kong Knight) in 1947.  She was scrapped in Taiwan in 1974.

Design and description
These ships were all larger and had a greater aircraft capacity than all the preceding American built escort carriers. They were also all laid down as escort carriers and not converted merchant ships.

Armament comprised: two 4"/50, 5"/38 or 5"/51 Dual Purpose guns in single mounts, sixteen 40 mm Bofors anti-aircraft guns in twin mounts and twenty 20 mm Oerlikon anti-aircraft cannons in single mounts. They had a maximum aircraft capacity of twenty-four aircraft which could be a mixture of Grumman Martlet, Vought F4U Corsair or Hawker Sea Hurricane fighter aircraft and Fairey Swordfish or Grumman Avenger anti-submarine aircraft.

Notes

References

 

Ships built in Seattle
1943 ships
Ruler-class escort carriers